Below are lists of films produced in Hong Kong in the 1980s.

List of Hong Kong films of 1980
List of Hong Kong films of 1981
List of Hong Kong films of 1982
List of Hong Kong films of 1983
List of Hong Kong films of 1984
List of Hong Kong films of 1985
List of Hong Kong films of 1986
List of Hong Kong films of 1987
List of Hong Kong films of 1988
List of Hong Kong films of 1989

See also
List of films set in Hong Kong

External links
 IMDB list of Hong Kong films

Films
Hong Kong